Namibia sent a delegate to compete at the 2008 Summer Paralympics in Beijing, China. According to official records, the country's only representative was Reginald Benade, who appeared in two events in athletics and won a bronze medal in the discus throw.

Medallists

Athletics

Men

See also
Namibia at the Paralympics
Namibia at the 2008 Summer Olympics

References

External links
International Paralympic Committee

Nations at the 2008 Summer Paralympics
2008
Summer Paralympics